Herbrand Pedersen Lofthus (10 December 1889 – 1 January 1972) was a lightweight Greco-Roman  wrestler from Norway who competed at the 1912 Summer Olympics.

References

External links
 

1889 births
1972 deaths
Olympic wrestlers of Norway
Wrestlers at the 1912 Summer Olympics
Norwegian male sport wrestlers
People from Rollag
Sportspeople from Viken (county)